Våmhus is a locality situated in Mora Municipality, Dalarna County, Sweden with 857 inhabitants in 2010. It is situated by the Orsa Lake's northwest beach.

Våmhus has a characteristic local dialect, Våmhusmål, distinct from other Dalecarlian dialects. Due to the relatively isolated location of Våmhus the Våmhusmål is still in use to some extent among the local population, although like all Swedish dialects it is in a general decline. The area is also known for its handicraft tradition, including basketry and "hair jewelry"(jewelry made of human hair).

The present urban area answers to an older parish by the same name, which covered 14 small villages:
 Kumbelnäs
 Vidbäcken
 Västra Storbyn
 Brändhol
 Myran
 Östra Storbyn
 Limbäck
 Moren
 Sivarsbacken
 Höjen
 Björkvassla
 Bäck
 Indor
 Heden

Notable residents 
Eric Wickman, born Martis Jerk, founder of Greyhound Lines

References 

Populated places in Dalarna County
Populated places in Mora Municipality